Garry Lewis (born August 26, 1986 in Orange Park, Florida) is an American retired soccer player who is currently an assistant coach at the University of the Cumberlands.

Career

Youth and College
Lewis attended Orange Park High School, played club soccer for the Clay County Soccer Club and West Kendall.

As a youth player Lewis was a Three-Time NSCAA/adidas Youth American. In 2005/04 he was First Team All-State for the State of Florida, and in 2003 as a sophomore in high school he was named "Gatorade State Player of the Year". Lewis also won two Super Y-League National Championships while playing for West Kendall Optimist in 2005 and in 2006.

After his first season of college soccer while at St. John's Red Storm, Lewis earned a spot on the 2005 Big East All-Freshmen First Team, and Nationally All-Freshmen by College Soccer News Third Team.

Upon transferring to the University of North Carolina at Chapel Hill Lewis' sophomore year, he became an impact starter. He earned the team's "Most Competitive Player Award" that same year. During his senior season Lewis lead his Tarheels as a team "co-captain" to the NCAA National Finals in Frisco, Texas against Maryland. They lost the game one to zero.

As a Tarheel Lewis tallied 11 goals and 5 assists, and in his senior season he scored the game winner in the Sweet Sixteen to put his team into the Elite Eight.

Lewis also played for Carolina Dynamo in the USL Premier Development League.

Professional
Lewis was signed by the Real Maryland Monarchs in the USL Second Division following the conclusion of the 2009 PDL season, and made his professional debut on July 11, 2009 in Maryland's 2–1 win over the Pittsburgh Riverhounds. After his department by Real Maryland Monarchs joined in October 2009 to Ekenäs Idrottsförening.

References

External links
Real Maryland Monarchs bio
North Carolina bio

1986 births
Living people
American soccer players
North Carolina Fusion U23 players
Real Maryland F.C. players
USL League Two players
USL Second Division players
St. John's Red Storm men's soccer players
North Carolina Tar Heels men's soccer players
Ekenäs IF players
Jacksonville Armada FC players
FC Tulsa players
USL Championship players
People from Orange Park, Florida
Salon Palloilijat players
Association football midfielders
Soccer players from Jacksonville, Florida
American expatriate soccer players
Expatriate footballers in Finland
American expatriate sportspeople in Finland
American expatriate soccer coaches
Cumberlands Patriots coaches
College men's soccer coaches in the United States